Peter Joseph Carril (July 10, 1930 – August 15, 2022) was an American basketball coach. He is best known as head coach of Princeton University for 30 years and for his use of the "Princeton offense". He also coached at Lehigh University and as an assistant with the Sacramento Kings in the National Basketball Association (NBA).

Early life
Pedro José Carril was born in Bethlehem, Pennsylvania, on July 10, 1930.  His father, an immigrant from Spain, was employed as a steelworker at Bethlehem Steel for four decades and brought up his son as a single father.  Carril attended Liberty High School in his hometown, where he was an all-state selection for Pennsylvania.  He then studied at Lafayette College in Easton, Pennsylvania, playing college basketball for the Lafayette Leopards under Butch van Breda Kolff.  Carril was honored as a Little All-American during his senior year in 1952. While at Lafayette, he became a member of Delta Tau Delta International Fraternity.  After graduating from college, he served briefly in the US Army.  He later obtained a master's degree in educational administration from Lehigh University in 1959.

Career

High school coaching
Carril first worked as the junior varsity basketball coach and ninth grade Pennsylvania history teacher at Easton Area High School, starting in 1954. In 1958, Carril became varsity coach at Reading Senior High School in Reading, Pennsylvania, where Gary Walters, the former Princeton University athletic director and earlier Princeton point guard played basketball under him in high school.

College coaching

After a year at Lehigh University, Carril moved to Princeton University.  In 29 years, he compiled a 514–261 (.663 winning percentage) record.  He is also the only men's coach to win 500 games without the benefit of athletic scholarships for his players.  He won or shared 13 Ivy League championships and received 11 NCAA tournament berths and 2 NIT bids.  The Tigers won the NIT championship in 1975.

Carril's Tigers had the nation's best scoring defense in 14 out of 21 years from 1975 to 1996, including eight in a row from 1988 to 1996.  Games against Princeton were typically low-scoring affairs; for example, the 1990–91 and 1991–92 Tigers are the only teams to hold opponents below 50 points per game since the shot clock became mandatory for the 1985–86 season.  Partly due to these factors, while his Tigers only won three NCAA Tournament games, they were known as a very dangerous first-round opponent; seven of their first round losses were by fewer than ten points.

In 1989, Princeton took first-ranked Georgetown down to the wire, leading by eight points at halftime before losing 50–49.  Had the Tigers won, they would have been the first #16 seed to defeat a #1 seed since the NCAA began seeding the tournament field in 1979.  Seven years later, Carril's final collegiate victory was an upset of defending national champions UCLA in the first round of the NCAA tournament in 1996 by a score of 43–41, in what is considered one of the greatest upsets of all time.

Carill's career collegiate coaching record, including one season at Lehigh University in Bethlehem, Pennsylvania, was 525–273.  He was enshrined in both the National Collegiate Basketball Hall of Fame and the Naismith Memorial Basketball Hall of Fame in 1997, following his retirement from Princeton.

Sacramento Kings
Carril was an assistant coach for the Sacramento Kings of the National Basketball Association for 10 years until his retirement in 2006.  After Rick Adelman became Sacramento's head coach before the 1998–99 season, Carril helped Adelman install the Princeton offensive game plan and oversaw the Kings' development into one of the NBA's most potent offensive teams.  During his tenure, the Kings were noted for their quick-passing offense, as well as their ability to stymie double teaming attempts from their opponents.  In 2007, he volunteered as a coach with the Washington Wizards.  He subsequently rejoined the Kings as an assistant for the 2009 season.

Personal life
Carril was married to Dolores Halteman.  Together, they had two children: Peter and Lisa.  They eventually divorced.

Carril suffered a heart attack in 2000, which spurred him to quit smoking Macanudo cigars altogether.  He died August 15, 2022 at Penn Hospital in Philadelphia.  He was 92, and suffered a stroke prior to his death.

Head coaching record
Source:

Publications

References

Further reading

External links
 

1930 births
2022 deaths
American men's basketball players
American people of Spanish descent
Basketball coaches from Pennsylvania
Basketball players from Pennsylvania
College men's basketball head coaches in the United States
High school basketball coaches in Pennsylvania
Lafayette Leopards men's basketball players
Lehigh Mountain Hawks men's basketball coaches
Lehigh University alumni
Liberty High School (Bethlehem, Pennsylvania) alumni
Military personnel from Pennsylvania
Naismith Memorial Basketball Hall of Fame inductees
National Collegiate Basketball Hall of Fame inductees
Princeton Tigers men's basketball coaches
Sacramento Kings assistant coaches
Sportspeople from Bethlehem, Pennsylvania
United States Army officers
United States Army personnel of the Korean War